Strawberry Hill is a historic plantation house located in Edenton, North Carolina, and owned by William and Laurie Raucci. The original section was built about 1788 in a Georgian/Federal style then enlarged to its present size in the early- to mid-19th century.  It is a two-story, frame dwelling with a center hall plan.  The front facade features a two-tiered, full-length porch.  The original portion of the house was built by Congressman Charles Johnson.

It was listed on the National Register of Historic Places in 1980.

References

Plantation houses in North Carolina
Houses on the National Register of Historic Places in North Carolina
Georgian architecture in North Carolina
Federal architecture in North Carolina
Houses completed in 1788
Houses in Chowan County, North Carolina
National Register of Historic Places in Chowan County, North Carolina
1788 establishments in North Carolina